is an RPG for the PlayStation that features popular tokusatsu such as Ultraman Gaia and Kamen Rider. It is the only sequel to Super Hero Operations, also for PlayStation.

Players assume the role of Gamu Takayama, a member of the fighting force XIG, as he combats evil creatures with the power of Ultraman Gaia. Along the way, he meets other heroes, such as Space Sheriff Gavan, Seiun Kamen Machineman, and Kikaider.

The battle system of Super Hero Sakusen: Diedal's Ambition is turn-based; characters take turn inputting and executing commands.

Neither of these two games were ever released outside Japan.

Playable Characters
Characters from the following series were included in the game:
Ultraman
Ultra Seven
The Return of Ultraman
Ultraman Gaia
Inazuman
Kamen Rider
Kamen Rider V3
Kamen Rider Black
Kamen Rider Black RX
Kikaider
Kikaider 01
Nebula Mask Machine Man
Kaiketsu Zubat
Space Sheriff Gavan
Space Sheriff Sharivan
Space Sheriff Shaider

2000 video games
Banpresto games
Crossover tokusatsu
Japan-exclusive video games
PlayStation (console) games
PlayStation (console)-only games
Role-playing video games
Video game sequels
Ultra Series video games
Kamen Rider video games
Metal Hero Series
Video games developed in Japan